Uzbekistan competed at the 2014 Winter Olympics in Sochi, Russia from 7 to 23 February 2014. A team of three athletes in two sports competed for Uzbekistan.

Alpine skiing 

Uzbekistan qualified two athletes to compete.

Figure skating 

Uzbekistan achieved the following quota places: Misha Ge finished in 17th position out of 30 competitors in the men's singles event.

See also
Uzbekistan at the 2014 Summer Youth Olympics
Uzbekistan at the 2014 Winter Paralympics

References

External links 
Uzbekistan at the 2014 Winter Olympics

Nations at the 2014 Winter Olympics
2014
Winter Olympics